Lethocerus uhleri, or Uhler's water bug, is a species of giant water bug in the family Belostomatidae. It is found in eastern North America from New York, Michigan, and Wisconsin south to Florida and northern Tamaulipas.

References

Belostomatidae
Articles created by Qbugbot
Insects described in 1896